Fundamentals of Stack Gas Dispersion is a book devoted to the fundamentals of air pollution dispersion modeling of continuous, buoyant pollution plumes from stationary point sources. The first edition was published in 1979. The current fourth edition was published in 2005.

The subjects covered in the book include atmospheric turbulence and stability classes, buoyant plume rise, Gaussian dispersion calculations and modeling, time-averaged concentrations, wind velocity profiles, fumigations, trapped plumes and gas flare stack plumes.  The constraints and assumptions involved in the basic equations are fully explained.

The book has received favorable reviews, including a description of its "simple straightforward explanations" for a "full course in single-source dispersive modeling".

The book has been purchased in 84 countries and as of 2015 is available in 233 libraries worldwide. It has been referenced or cited as an educational resource more than 880 times in the technical literature and on the Internet, including 34 regulatory publications of state or national governmental agencies worldwide. It has also been used as recommended reading or a textbook in 61 university courses. 

The book is now available only as a downloadable version in PDF format.

Book contents

Chapter 1: Atmospheric Parameters
Chapter 2: Gaussian Dispersion Equations
Chapter 3: Dispersion Coefficients
Chapter 4: Plume Rise
Chapter 5: Time-Averaging Of Concentrations
Chapter 6: Wind Velocity Profiles

Chapter 7: Calculating Stack Gas Plume Dispersion
Chapter 8: Trapped Plumes
Chapter 9: Fumigation
Chapter 10: Meteorological Data
Chapter 11: Flare Stack Plume Rise
Chapter 12: Miscellany

Reviews
James P. Lodge (November 1995), "Book review", Atmospheric Environment, Vol. 29, No. 22, p. 3397,:
Karen Kowalewsky (January 1997), "Book reviews", Bulletin of the American Meteorological Society, Vol. 78, No. 1, pp. 90–94,
Stanley S. Grossel (August 1995), "Book review", Chemical Engineering Progress, Vol. 91, No. 8, p. 88,

See also

Accidental release source terms
ADMS 3 
AERMOD
Air pollution dispersion terminology
Air Quality Modeling Group
Atmospheric dispersion modeling
Bibliography of atmospheric dispersion modeling
List of atmospheric dispersion models
UK Atmospheric Dispersion Modelling Liaison Committee
Useful conversions and formulas for air dispersion modeling

References

External links

Atmospheric dispersion modeling
Environmental non-fiction books
Technology books
1979 non-fiction books
1979 in the environment